The 2018 Taça de Portugal Final was the last match of the 2017–18 Taça de Portugal, which decided the winner of the 78th season of the Taça de Portugal. It was played on 20 May 2018 at the Estádio Nacional in Oeiras, between Desportivo das Aves and Sporting CP. 
This was the first appearance for Desportivo das Aves in a Taça de Portugal final. The match was won by Desportivo das Aves.

Route to the final

Note: H = home fixture, A = away fixture

Match

Details

References

2018
2017–18 in Portuguese football
C.D. Aves matches
Sporting CP matches
May 2018 sports events in Portugal